The Pagani Zonda is a mid-engine sports car produced by Italian sports car manufacturer Pagani. It debuted at the 1999 Geneva Motor Show. Produced on comission in limited units, as of 2019 a total of 140 cars had been built, including development mules. Variants include a 2-door coupé and roadster variant, along with a third new variant being the barchetta. Construction is mainly of carbon fibre.

The Zonda was originally to be named the "Fangio F1" after Formula One champion Juan Manuel Fangio, but, following his death in 1995, it was renamed for the Zonda wind, a term for a hot air current above Argentina.

Model variants

Zonda C12

The Zonda C12 debuted in 1999 at the Geneva Motor Show.

Only five cars were built with the 6.0 L 
engine, though the C12 was still available in 2002 when the C12 S was introduced. One was used for crash testing and homologation, while another was a demonstrator and show car. The remainder were delivered to customers during the next three years. The crash test and homologation car having chassis number 001 was restored by Pagani's recently established restoration program called "Pagani Rinascimento" and was presented to the public at the 2019 Geneva Motor Show for the Zonda's 20th anniversary.

Zonda C12-S

Lateral acceleration on the skidpad is 1.18 g (11.6 m/s²).

Zonda S 7.3

To better handle the power, traction control and ABS were made standard. Performance claims were unchanged from the Zonda C12-S.

Zonda Roadster

In 2003, Pagani presented the Zonda Roadster, an open top version of the Zonda S 7.3. A total of 40 roadsters were produced.

Zonda F

The Zonda F (or Zonda Fangio - named after Formula One driver Juan Manuel Fangio) debuted at the 2005 Geneva Motor Show. The transmission is largely the same as the C12 S but had stronger internals and differential gears.

Production of the Zonda F was limited to 25 cars. It came equipped with an extra headlight and a new configuration of fog lights in the lower grille, new bodywork (revised front end, new rear spoiler, more aerodynamic vents all around) that improved the car's aerodynamics, and different side mirrors. Further enhancements over the "S" centered on optional carbon/ceramic brakes (measuring 380 mm) developed in conjunction with Brembo, OZ alloy wheels, Inconel exhaust system, hydroformed aluminium intake plenum, and a redesigned "Z preg" weave in the crash structure to improve rigidity and reduce weight.

Zonda Roadster F

The Zonda Roadster F debuted at the 2006 Geneva Motor Show. Exterior wise, the roadster was similar to the coupé, but with a removable carbon fibre roof and canvas side curtains, weighing just  more than the coupé. Production of the Roadster F was limited to 25 units.

Pagani instead used racing car materials, and construction techniques, strengthening the firewall structure of the chassis tub together with billet alloy braces that connected the points where the roof rails would have joined. The windscreen was also strengthened for safety reasons. These techniques enabled the Roadster to have virtually the same weight as the coupé, .

The Zonda Roadster F Clubsport is a light weight version of the Zonda Roadster F. It has an extensive use of the new carbo-titanium material developed Pagani as well as having an upgraded engine. It was tested by Top Gear's The Stig along with James May and achieved a lap time around their test track of 1:17.8, beating the Bugatti Veyron 16.4 tested during the same episode, but lost in a quarter mile drag race against the Veyron by nearly 2.5 seconds. German racing driver Marc Basseng managed to lap the Zonda F Clubsport around the  Nürburgring Nordschleife in 7:24.7.

Zonda R 

In 2007, Pagani introduced the Zonda R at the Geneva Motor Show, a track-only version of the Pagani Zonda.

Zonda Cinque  

The Zonda Cinque (Italian for five) was meant to be the last iteration of the Zonda, being a road-legal version of the Zonda R. Only five were built, hence the name, with deliveries set to June 2009 for all five cars. The Zonda Cinque was developed at the request of a Pagani dealer in Hong Kong.

The differences from other variants of the Zonda were the new 6-speed automated manual gearbox, resulting in shifts taking less than 100 milliseconds, dropping the 0– acceleration time down to 3.4 seconds. The gearbox has three driving modes, namely Comfort, Sport and Race which optimises the gearbox for different driving conditions. The Cinque also had a revised form of carbon fibre called "carbo-titanium" which incorporates titanium in the weave to increase strength and rigidity.

The Zonda Roadster Cinque had the same specifications as the coupé from which it was derived. Only five units were built, like the coupé.

Zonda Tricolore

The Zonda Tricolore, originally conceived as a one-off before production totaled three, was built as a tribute to the Frecce Tricolori, Italy's aerobatic team. It carried much of the body from the Zonda Cinque. The car was unpainted except for a clear blue lacquer, and red, white, and green stripes from the nose along the top of the car's surface. Unique to this car was a small wing placed behind the cockpit which reflected the tail wing of Frecce Tricolori's Aermacchi MB-339 PAN stunt plane. The three Tricolores were priced at £1.2 million.

Zonda Revolución 

In 2012 Pagani introduced the Zonda Revolución at the Goodwood Festival of Speed, an evolution of the Pagani Zonda R.

Zonda HP Barchetta

The Zonda HP Barchetta was unveiled at the 2017 Pebble Beach Concours d'Elegance as a present to the company's founder, Horacio Pagani for his 60th birthday as well as to commemorate the 18th anniversary of the Zonda. It has unique exterior design cues which makes it different from other Zondas produced with the most distinguishable features being the barchetta body style and rear wheel covers inspired by group C race cars, making it the first Pagani to ever use this styling. It also has a rear spoiler, air intakes and rear lights taken from the 760 series cars. It borrows its seats and suspension from the Huayra BC along with its power output being identical to the BC with the only difference being that the BC has a Bi-turbo engine while the HP Barchetta is naturally aspirated. The wheels of the car also have different colour inlays with the wheels at the left having gold and the wheels at the right having blue inlays. Production is limited to just 3 units with one unit retained for Horacio Pagani's personal collection. The Zonda HP Barchetta marks an end to the Zonda's production run.

Technical data (all production variants)

Zonda One-off Series 
The Zonda One-Off Series is a custom line-up built for special customers, sometimes made as rebuilds of existing (and sometimes crashed) Zonda chassis.

Racing

Zonda GR

Development of the Zonda GR started in December 2002. Tom Weickardt, owner of American Viperacing, Toine Hezemans, owner of Carsport Holland, and Paul Kumpen, owner of GLPK Racing, incorporated a new company, Carsport Zonda, to develop a racing version of the Zonda. They secured exclusive rights to develop, build and sell competition versions of the Zonda from Horacio Pagani, and the first GR was completed at Carsport's facility in Modena within months.

The Zonda GR is based on the Zonda S. It was built on the same carbon fibre chassis, with lightweight tube frames present on the front and rear. The bodywork was modified to include front and rear diffusers and louvers for improved aerodynamics. Along with new motorsport-oriented wheels and brakes. The engine was equipped with an enlarged radiator, two air intake restrictor plates, and the engine and gearbox also had new oil coolers. Performance figures include a 0 to  acceleration time of 3.3 seconds. 

The car was entered into the 2003 24 Hours of Le Mans, but retired after ten laps due to a gearbox failure.

See also
List of Top Gear test track Power Lap times

Notes

Bibliography

External links

 
 

Pagani vehicles
Roadsters
Rear mid-engine, rear-wheel-drive vehicles
2000s cars
Cars introduced in 1999
First car made by manufacturer
Sports cars